Kivuva is a surname. Notable people with the surname include:

Jackson Kivuva (born 1989), Kenyan middle-distance runner
Martin Kivuva Musonde (born 1952), Kenyan Roman Catholic Archbishop

Surnames of Kenyan origin